Taft Independent School District is a school district serving Taft, Texas (USA).

In addition to Taft, the district also serves the unincorporated community of Taft Southwest

In 2009, the school district was rated "academically acceptable" by the Texas Education Agency.

List of Schools
Taft High School (Grades 9-12)
Taft Junior High School (Grades 6-8)
Woodrow Petty Elementary School (Grades K-5)

See also
List of school districts in Texas

References

External links
 

School districts in San Patricio County, Texas